Baluwatar may refer to:

Baluwatar, Bheri, Nepal
Baluwatar, Kathmandu, Nepal